Milk Race is a computer game released in 1987 for the ZX Spectrum, Commodore 64, Atari 8-bit family, MSX, and Amstrad CPC. It was developed by Phil Berry, Stuart Ruecroft, and composer David Whittaker for Icon Design.

Gameplay
Based around the internationally acclaimed event in world cycle race The Milk Race (now known as Tour of Britain). This simulator was designed to coincide with the 1987 event, starting in Newcastle upon Tyne, through the North of England, and down through the Midlands, to London for the finishing line. The basic premise of the game is to control a bike using acceleration, braking and choosing the correct gear to conserve energy.

External links
 
 Milk Race at Atari Mania
 Milk Race C64 Version Long Play Video

1987 video games
ZX Spectrum games
Amstrad CPC games
Commodore 64 games
Atari 8-bit family games
MSX games
Cycling video games
Video games developed in the United Kingdom
Mastertronic games